Terbium(III) hydroxide is an inorganic compound with chemical formula Tb(OH)3.

Chemical properties
Terbium(III) hydroxide reacts with acids and produces terbium(III) salts:
 Tb(OH)3 + 3 H+ → Tb3+ + 3 H2O
Terbium(III) hydroxide decomposes to TbO(OH) at 340°C. Further decomposition at 500°C generates Tb4O7 and O2.

References

Terbium compounds
Hydroxides